The Hungarian Forum (styled as Magyar Fórum – Maďarské fórum; MF) is a Slovak political party which was established on 28 February 2019. Its founder and chairman is the former minister and politician of SMK–MKP and Most–Híd, Member of the National Council, Zsolt Simon. 

The main goal of the party is to ensure the parliamentary representation of Hungarians in Slovakia and to use it as a tool for actions so that people from the Hungarian community are equal citizens of a democratic Slovakia.

History 
The party was founded in February 2019 by Zsolt Simon, a non-attached member of the National Council of the Slovak Republic, who resigned from the Most–Híd party in 2016 due to its entry into the governing coalition with the Smer-SD and SNS parties.

Prior to the 2020 elections, the party intensively negotiated a joint list of candidates with the remaining four parties of the Hungarian minority (SMK-MKP, MOST-HÍD, MKDA-MKDSZ and Spolupatričnosť), but by the end of October 2019 the parties had not reached an agreement. The problem is a different view of the possibility of cooperation with current government parties. The Hungarian Forum refuses to cooperate with SMER, SNS and ĽSNS. If there is no joint coalition candidacy of all five parties, the Hungarian Forum wants to run with the SMK and the Co-operation under the name Hungarian Community Co-operation. In November 2019, they announced that they were preparing a three-party coalition with the SMK and the MKÖ-MKS.

Party program 
The party has as its priorities a change in the preamble of the Constitution of Slovakia, a change in the financing of local governments, as well as a change in the territorial and legal division of the country (counties, districts). The Hungarian Forum wants to push for the southern regions to receive an average amount of public investment and expenditure, from infrastructure development, through the support of industrial parks and private investment, to the promotion of Hungarian cultural life. In the cultural field, it requires the unrestricted use of the Hungarian mother tongue, both verbally and in writing, in the regions where the minority lives, and in official relations its equivalence with the official Slovak language.

Presidency currently up to 6 November 2019:

 Zsolt Simon - Chairman
 Erzsébet Janits - Vice-Chairman
 Zsolt Gál - Vice-Chairman
 Viktor Bugár - Member of the Presidency
 Tamás Bojtoš - Member of the Presidency
 Dániel Miklóš - Member of the Presidency

Notes

References

External links 

 Party's official page
 Hungarian Forum in the register of political parties and political movements of the Ministry of the Interior of the Slovak Republic

Political parties established in 2019
2019 establishments in Slovakia
Political parties in Slovakia
Political parties of minorities in Slovakia
Hungarian minority interests parties